The 1937–38 Nationalliga A season was the first season of the Nationalliga A. It replaced the Swiss National Championship Serie A as the top level of ice hockey in Switzerland. Six teams participated in the league, and HC Davos won the championship.

Standings

External links
 Championnat de Suisse 1937/38

Swiss
1937–38 in Swiss ice hockey